The following is a list of the municipalities (comuni) of Emilia-Romagna, Italy.

There are 328 municipalities in Emilia-Romagna (as of January 2019):

55 in the Metropolitan City of Bologna
21 in the Province of Ferrara
30 in the Province of Forlì-Cesena
47 in the Province of Modena
44 in the Province of Parma
46 in the Province of Piacenza
18 in the Province of Ravenna
42 in the Province of Reggio Emilia
25 in the Province of Rimini

List

See also
List of municipalities of Italy

References

 
Geography of Emilia-Romagna
Emilia-Romagna